The following is a list of notable deaths in July 1992.

Entries for each day are listed alphabetically by surname. A typical entry lists information in the following sequence:
 Name, age, country of citizenship at birth, subsequent country of citizenship (if applicable), reason for notability, cause of death (if known), and reference.

July 1992

1
Franco Cristaldi, 61, Italian film producer.
Stan Frazier, 54, American professional wrestler, kidney failure.
Jack Hood, 89, British boxing champion.
Scott Meredith, 69, American literary agent.
Brian O'Brien, 94, American optical physicist.
T. Prakash Rao, 67, Indian filmmaker.
Newton Ogilvie Thompson, 88, South African judge, Chief Justice of South Africa (1971–1974).

2
Lyle Boren, 83, American politician, member of the U.S. House of Representatives (1937–1947).
Charles F. Brannan, 88, American politician, Secretary of Agriculture (1948-1953).
Camarón de la Isla, 41, Spanish flamenco singer, lung cancer.
Hans Jendretzky, 94, German communist politician.
Borislav Pekić, 62, Serbian author, lung cancer.

3
Arnold Belkin, 61, Canadian-Mexican painter.
Ed Berrang, 69, American football player.
Jeanine Delpech, 86, French novelist.
Wally Kilrea, 83, Canadian ice hockey player.
Luigi Marchisio, 83, Italian road racing cyclist.
Enzo Matteucci, 58, Italian football player, ALS.
Koroglu Rahimov, 38, Azerbaijani division commander and war hero, killed in action.
Anne Parsons, Countess of Rosse, 90, English socialite.
George Staller, 76, American baseball player, scout and coach.
Clive Stoneham, 83, Australian politician.
Marc H. Tanenbaum, 66, American rabbi and social justice activist, heart failure.

4
David Abercrombie, 82, British phonetician.
Djatikoesoemo, 75, Indonesian Army officer and diplomat.
Harry Gottlieb, 96, American painter, lithographer, and educator, Alzheimer's disease.
Joe Newman, 69, American jazz trumpeter, complications from a stroke.
Francis Perrin, 90, French physicist.
Astor Piazzolla, 71, Argentine tango musician, complications from a cerebral hemorrhage.
Richard Smart, 79, American musical theatre actor and singer.
Lyudmila Tselikovskaya, 72, Russian actress, cancer.

5
Georgia Brown, 58, English singer and actress, complications from surgery.
Peter-Erich Cremer, 81, German U-boat commander during World War II.
Paul Hackman, 38, Canadian guitarist, traffic collision.
Pauline Jewett, 69, Canadian politician, cancer.

6
Frank Akins, 73, American gridiron football player.
Amadeus August, 50, German actor and singer, AIDS-related complications.
Marsha P. Johnson, 46, American LGBT activist and drag queen, head injury.
Bryan Guinness, 2nd Baron Moyne, 86, British hereditary peer.
Vsevolod Safonov, 66, Soviet actor of theatre and cinema, cancer.
Mary Q. Steele, 70, American author.

7
Josy Barthel, 65, Luxembourgish Olympic runner (1952).
Grace Carlson, 85, American politician.
Mika Feldman de Etchebéhère, 90, Argentine militant anarchist and marxist.
Clint Frank, 76, American football player.
Juanita Jackson Mitchell, 79, American lawyer.
Vernon Smith, 32, American basketball player, shot.
Pat Taaffe, 62, Irish jockey.

8
Giacomo Conti, 74, Italian bobsledder and Olympic champion.
Zoltán Soós-Ruszka Hradetzky, 90, Hungarian sport shooter and Olympic medalist.
Ottfried Neubecker, 84, German vexillologist and heraldist.
Nikolay Smirnov, 74, Soviet admiral.

9
Kelvin Coe, 45, Australian ballet dancer, AIDS.
Arne Falk-Rønne, 71, Danish travel writer.
Raimundo Fernández-Cuesta, 95, Spanish Falange politician.
Fikret Hodžić, 39, Yugoslav/Bosnian bodybuilder, murdered.
Eric Sevareid, 79, American journalist, stomach cancer.

10
Ion Bogdan, 77, Romanian football player.
Walt Masters, 85, American gridiron football player.
Albert Pierrepoint, 87, English executioner.
Doris Tate, 68, American crime victims rights activist, brain cancer.

11
Munroe Bourne, 82, Canadian Olympic swimmer (1928).
Hajrudin Krvavac, 65, Bosnian film director.
Constantin Pîrvulescu, 96, Romanian communist politician.
Deng Yingchao, 88, Chinese official, widow of Zhou Enlai.

12
Reginald Beck, 90, British film editor.
Elsie Driggs, 94, American painter.
Ted Fenton, 77, English football player and manager, traffic collision.
Caroline Pafford Miller, 88, American novelist.
Bakhsheyis Pashayev, 56, Azerbaijani soldier, killed in battle.
Carlo Van Neste, 78, Belgian violinist.
Mariechen Wehselau, 86, American swimmer, Olympic champion, and world record-holder.
Edgar Bright Wilson, 83, American chemist.

13
Giovanni Battista Breda, 60, Italian fencer.
Heinrich Eberbach, 96, German general during World War II.
Christopher Ironside, 79, English painter and coin designer.
Vince Scott, 67, Canadian football player.
Cicely Williams, 98, Jamaican physician.
Alex Wojciechowicz, 76, American football player.

14
Barbara Comyns, 84, English writer and artist.
Thomas Hicks, 74, American bobsledder and Olympic medalist.
Ikhtiyar Kasimov, 22, Azerbaijani soldier and war hero, killed in action.
Slavko Luštica, 69, Yugoslav football player.
Danny McShain, 79, American professional wrestler.
Yılmaz Şen, 49, Turkish football player.

15
Jim Buntine, 90, Australian Chief Commissioner of Girl Guides (1962-1968).
Hammer DeRoburt, 69, Nauruan politician, president (1968–1976, 1978–1989), diabetes.
Ernestine Eckstein, 51, American LGBT activist.
Enrico Garzelli, 82, Italian rower and Olympic medalist.
Johnny Martin, 60, Australian cricket player.
Marianne Simson, 71, German dancer and film actress.

16
Buck Buchanan, 51, American gridiron football player, lung cancer.
Tatyana Pelttser, 88, Russian actress.
Jack Surtees, 81, English footballer.
Mai-Mai Sze, 82, Chinese-American writer and painter.

17
Ingemar Andersson, 64, Swedish sprint canoeist and Olympian.
Kanan Devi, 76, Indian actress and singer.
Johnny Letman, 74, American jazz trumpeter.
Don R. Pears, 92, American politician.
Larry Roberts, 65, American voice actor (Lady and the Tramp) and fashion designer, AIDS-related complications.

18
Pierce Brodkorb, 83, American ornithologist and paleontologist.
Willa Brown, 86, American aviator.
Pang Hak-se, 80, North Korean politician.
Rudolf Ising, 88, American animator (Looney Tunes, Merrie Melodies, Tom and Jerry), cancer.
Victor Louis, 64, Soviet journalist and disinformation operative, heart attack.
Giuseppe Paupini, 85, Italian cardinal of the Catholic Church.
Jan Pelleboer, 68, Dutch meteorologist.
Laura Rodríguez, 35, Chilean political activist, brain tumor.
Helmut Schmid, 67, German actor.

19
Paolo Borsellino, 52, Italian magistrate, assassination by car bomb.
Heinz Galinski, 79, German activist.
Allen Newell, 65, American computer scientist, cancer.
Alan E. Nourse, 63, American science fiction writer and physician.
Bert Peer, 81, Canadian ice hockey player.

20
John Bratby, 64, English painter, heart attack.
Ed Goddard, 77, American football player, cancer.
Bruce Henderson, 78, American businessman and management expert.
Artem Kopot, 19, Russian ice hockey player, traffic collision.
John Tinsley, 73, British Anglican prelate, Bishop of Bristol (1975–1985).

21
Mario Boyé, 69, Argentine football player.
Ravindra Dave, 73, Indian filmmaker.
Aloys Fleischmann, 82, Irish composer, conductor, and musicologist.
Edward Dean Kennedy, 47, American murderer, execution by electrocution.
Ernst Schäfer, 82, German explorer, hunter and zoologist.
Helmut Seibt, 63, Austrian Olympic figure skater (1952).
Petar Tanchev, 72, Bulgarian politician.

22
Reginald Bretnor, 80, American science fiction author.
Ya'akov Hazan, 93, Israeli politician and social activist.
Wayne McLaren, 51, American actor and stuntman (Marlboro Man), lung cancer.
John Meyendorff, 66, French-American theologian, pancreatic cancer.
F. S. C. Northrop, 98, American philosopher.
K. N. Udupa, 72, Indian surgeon and academic.
David Wojnarowicz, 37, American photographer, filmmaker, and painter, AIDS.

23
Arletty, 94, French actress.
Maxine Audley, 69, English actress. 
Tord Bernheim, 78, Swedish singer, actor, and revue performer.
Suleiman Frangieh, 82, Lebanese politician, president (1970–1976), pneumonia.
Robert Liddell, 83, English literary critic, biographer, novelist, travel writer and poet.
Dmitry Maevsky, 75, Soviet and Russian painter.
Eugene Murdock, 71, American baseball historian.
Ian Proctor, 74, British sailboat designer.
Bill Striegel, 56, American gridiron football player.
Rosemary Sutcliff, 71, English novelist.

24
Sam Berger, 92, Canadian sports executive.
Serge de Gastyne, 61, American composer and pianist.
Gavriil Ilizarov, 71, Russian physician, heart failure.
Ernie Quinn, 66, Australian politician.

25
Ralph P. Boas, Jr., 79, American mathematician and journal editor.
Gunārs Cilinskis, 61, Latvian actor and filmmaker, heart attack.
Alfred Drake, 77, American actor, cancer.
Pola Nireńska, 81, Polish modern dancer, suicide.
Vittorio Sanipoli, 76, Italian actor.
Gary Windo, 50, English jazz tenor saxophonist, asthma.

26
Rita Atria, 17, Italian antimafia collaborator, suicide.
Tzeni Karezi, 60, Greek film and stage actress, cancer.
Janet Key, 47, English actress, cancer.
Ottorino Quaglierini, 77, Italian rower and Olympic medalist.
Richard D. Remington, 60, American academic.
Elga Olga Svendsen, 86, Danish film actress and singer.
Mary Wells, 49, American singer, laryngeal cancer.
Yasuharu Ōyama, 69, Japanese shogi player.

27
Max Dupain, 81, Australian photographer.
Amjad Khan, 51, Indian actor and film director, heart failure.
Salty Parker, 80, American baseball player, coach and manager.
Anthony Salerno, 80, American mobster and Genovese crime family boss, stroke.
Nat Silcock, Jr., 64, English rugby player and coach.
Ferdinand Wenauer, 53, German football player, heart failure.

28
Ron Daws, 55, American Olympic runner (1968), heart attack.
Seidou Njimoluh Njoya, 90, Cameroonian sultan.
Sulev Nõmmik, 61, Estonian actor, comedian, and theatre and movie director.
Jovan Rašković, 63, Croatian Serb psychiatrist, academic and politician, heart attack.
Lester Shorr, 85, American cinematographer.
 Albert Tavares, 39, American casting director.

29
Lucia Demetrius, 82, Romanian novelist, poet, and playwright.
Marcel Janssens, 60, Belgian cyclist.
Kemal Kayacan, 77, Turkish admiral, murdered.
Michel Larocque, 40, Canadian ice hockey player, brain cancer.
William Mathias, 57, Welsh composer.
Dominik Smole, 62, Slovenian playwright.
Dmitry Zubarev, 74, Russian theoretical physicist.

30
Nils Boe, 78, American attorney and politician.
Paul Gapp, 64, American journalist and Pulitzer prize winner, lung cancer.
Tonin Harapi, 64, Albanian composer and teacher.
Bo Lindman, 93, Swedish modern pentathlete and Olympic champion.
Brenda Marshall, 76, American actress, throat cancer.
Ken Myer, 71, American-Australian, businessman, diplomat, and philanthropist.
George Novack, 86, American marxist theoretician, and activist.
Joe Shuster, 78, Canadian-American comic artist, co-creator of Superman, heart failure.

31
Anvar Alikhanov, 75, Soviet politician and apparatchik.
Leonard Cheshire, 74, English RAF officer and philanthropist, motor neurone disease.
Uzi Peres, 41, Israeli film director, plane crash.
Ralph Strait, 56, American actor (The Beastmaster, Halloween III: Season of the Witch, Search for Tomorrow), heart attack.

References 

1992-07
 07